Brian Oulton (11 February 1908 – 13 April 1992) was an English character actor.

Biography
Born in Liverpool, Lancashire, Oulton made his acting debut in 1939 as a lead actor. During the Second World War he served in the British Army, and returned to acting playing character roles in 1946; he made a name for himself playing the same pompous character in numerous films, ranging from Last Holiday (1950) to Young Sherlock Holmes (1985). Many of his film roles were in comedies, and he went on to appear in several Carry On films.

In 1969, he appeared as an eccentric psychic medium in Randall and Hopkirk (Deceased) in the episode "Never Trust a Ghost"; as a hypochondriac GP in Doctor at Large; and in the 1981 hit serial Brideshead Revisited. He was also a stage actor and playwright, writing and starring in productions such as Births, Marriages and Deaths (1975), and For Entertainment Only (1976). Brian Oulton's radio credits include the role of Cyril in the long-running children's favourite Just William. He also guest starred as Neil's father in The Young Ones episode "Sick".

Brian Oulton lived latterly in Stratford-upon-Avon and was married to the actress Peggy Thorpe-Bates (from 1936 to 1989, her death), best known for her portrayal of the wife of Horace Rumpole ("she who must be obeyed") in the first television series of John Mortimer's novels. The couple had two children, a son and a daughter, the actress Jenny Oulton.

Selected filmography

 Sally in Our Alley (1931) as Minor Role (uncredited)
 Miranda (1948) as Manell
 Warning to Wantons (1949) as Gilbertier
 It's Not Cricket (1949) as Simon Herbage
 The Huggetts Abroad (1949) as Travel Clerk
 Last Holiday (1950) as Prescott
 Young Wives' Tale (1951) as Man in pub
 Castle in the Air (1952) as Phillips
 Will Any Gentleman...? (1953) as Mr Jackson
 The Dog and the Diamonds (1953) as Mr. Plumpton
 The Million Pound Note (1954) as Lloyd
 Doctor in the House (1954) as Medical Equipment Salesman
 The Crowded Day (1954) as Mr. Preedy
 Miss Tulip Stays the Night (1955) as Dr Willis
 Reluctant Bride (1955) as Prof. Baker
 The Deep Blue Sea (1955) as Drunk
 Private's Progress (1956) as M.O. at Gravestone Camp
 The Man Who Never Was (1956) as Wills Officer (uncredited)
 Charley Moon (1956) as Mr. Paxton
 Brothers in Law (1957) as Client
 The Good Companions (1957) as Fauntley
 Let's Be Happy (1957) as Hotel Valet
 Happy Is the Bride (1958) as 2nd Magistrate
 The Silent Enemy (1958) as Holford
 The Spaniard's Curse (1958) as Frank Porter
 Carry On Nurse (1959) as Henry Bray
 The 39 Steps (1959) as Mr Pringle
 I'm All Right Jack (1959) as Appointments Board Examiner
 The Devil's Disciple (1959) as Mr. Brudenell
 Carry On Constable (1960) as Store Manager
 A French Mistress (1960) as Third Governor
 There Was a Crooked Man (1960) as Ashton
 Suspect (1960) as Director
 The Bulldog Breed (1960) as Bert Ainsworth (cinema manager)
 No Kidding (1960) as Vicar
 Very Important Person (1961) as Scientist
 Raising the Wind (1961) as Concert Agent
 Hair of the Dog (1962) as Gregory Willett
 Jigsaw (1962) as Frank Restlin
 Steptoe and Son (1962) as Piano Owner
 The Damned (1963) as Mr Dingle
 The Kiss of the Vampire (1963) as 1st disciple
 Carry On Cleo (1964) as Brutus
 The Intelligence Men (1965) as Laundry Basket Man
 Devils of Darkness (1965) as The Colonel
 Carry On Camping (1969) as Mr. Short
 Some Will, Some Won't (1970) as Mr Dale
 On the Buses (1971) as Bus Depot Manager
 Mr. Forbush and the Penguins (1971) as Foot Store Man
 Ooh… You Are Awful (1972) as Funeral Director
 Carry On Christmas (1972) as Oriental Orator
 The Old Curiosity Shop (1979) as The Schoolmaster
 Gandhi (1982) as Clerk of Court
 Young Sherlock Holmes (1985) as Master Snelgrove

External links

References

1908 births
1992 deaths
English male film actors
English male television actors
Male actors from Liverpool
20th-century English male actors
British Army personnel of World War II